The Chevrolet Van or Chevy Van (also known as the Chevrolet/GMC G-series vans and GMC Vandura) is a range of vans that was manufactured by General Motors from the 1964 to 1996 model years. Introduced as the successor for the rear-engine Corvair Corvan/Greenbrier, the model line also replaced the panel van configuration of the Chevrolet Suburban. The vehicle was sold both in passenger van and cargo van configurations as well as a cutaway van chassis that served as the basis for a variety of custom applications.

Produced across three generations (1964–66, 1967–70, and 1970–1996), the model line was sold under a wide variety of model names under both the Chevrolet and GMC brands.  The first two generations were forward control vehicles (with the engine placed between the seats); the third generation adopted a configuration placing the engine forward of the driver.  The second and third generations shared powertrain commonality with the C/K pickup truck model line.   

After the 1996 model year, GM retired the G-Series vans, replacing them with the GMT600-platform Chevrolet Express/GMC Savana (currently in production).

First generation (1964-1966) 

The first General Motors van was the Chevrolet Corvair-based Chevrolet Greenbrier van, or Corvan introduced for 1961, which used an air cooled flat-six rear engine design, inspired by the Volkswagen bus. Production of the Chevrolet Greenbrier ended during the 1965 model year.

First-generation Chevrolet van refers to the first G-10 half-ton production years 1964 through 1966. General Motors saw a market for a compact van based on a modified passenger car platform to compete with the already successful Ford Econoline and Dodge A100. The 1964 Chevrolet van had a cab-forward design with the engine placed in a "doghouse" between and behind the front seats. The implementation of situating the driver on top of the front axle with the engine near the front wheels is called internationally a "cab over" vehicle. Engines and brakes were sourced from the Chevy II, a more conventional compact car than Chevrolet Corvair.

This model was also sold by GMC as "Handi-Van". The 1st-generation vans were available in only the short 90-inch wheelbase and were only sold with the standard  90 hp straight-4 or a Chevrolet Straight-6 engine. A first-generation is identified by its single-piece flat windshield glass. The first 1964 Chevrolet van was originally marketed and sold as a panel van for purely utilitarian purposes. Windows were available as an option, but were simply cut into the sides from the factory. In 1965, Chevrolet added the "Sportvan", which featured windows actually integrated into the body. GMC marketed its window van as "Handi-Bus". Air conditioning, power steering, and power brakes were not available in the first-generation vans.

1964 
The new van was of simple construction and its box shape was designed to maximize the hauling of cargo, tools, and equipment. The base cargo model was the Chevyvan, available with or without windows and side cargo doors. Basic amenities such as a heater and a right-front passenger seat were options.

The   four-cylinder engine was standard equipment. Optional was the   Chevrolet Straight-6 engine. 

The Warner 3-speed manual transmission was standard with a column shift. A 2-speed Powerglide automatic transmission was optional.

1965 
The 1965 model year included minor changes. The grille openings were widened and received one additional slot just above the bumper to increase cooling. Seat belts were added.

The 1965 model year introduced the Chevrolet Sportvan and GMC Handi-Bus. The Sportvan was more of a passenger-friendly van with windows molded into the van body. A retractable rear courtesy step for the passenger side doors was used on the Sportvan.

1966 
The last model year of the flat glass front end on the Chevrolet vans was 1966. Changes included the addition of back-up lights, the side emblems were moved forward and now mounted on the front doors, and the antenna location was moved from the right side to the left side. 

The base model "Sportvan" now had two additional trim packages available: Sportvan Custom and Sportvan Deluxe. These featured available upgrades such as chrome bumpers, two-tone paint, rear passenger seats, interior paneling, padded dash, and chrome horn ring.

Second generation (1967-1970)

In 1967, the Chevrolet van received a major facelift. The forward control cab design was retained, but the doghouse was lengthened, widened, and slightly relocated in order to fit an optional V8 Chevrolet Small-Block engine. Engine cooling was improved with the addition of an optional larger cross-flow type radiator and a redesigned front that included a low-profile tunnel allowing more fresh air to the radiator. The second-generation vans were available in either the  wheelbase lengths. Power steering and "conventional" air conditioning (with dash vents and controls) were never available on the second-generation van.

1967
The second-generation Chevrolet van began with the 1967 model, with a new look to the vehicle and the availability of longer wheelbase versions as well as an optional V8 engine for the first time. The headlamps were relocated into a new grille; the rectangular tail lights were enlarged, and the curved windshield was new. The forward-control cab design was retained, but the doghouse was widened and lengthened to fit the optional V8 Chevrolet Small-Block engine. Engine cooling was improved with the redesigned doghouse; a larger optional crossflow radiator, and a redesigned front floor tunnel to provide more outside air to the radiator. 

The original short wheelbase  and the new long wheelbase  vans came with 5 on 4&3/4-inch lug bolt pattern. An addition for 1967 was the G-20 heavy duty 3/4 ton version. The G-20 featured heavier suspension, a 12-bolt rear axle, and increased hauling capability with wheels having a 6-lug bolt pattern. The G-20 model was available only on the 108-inch wheelbase version.

For 1967, the   I6 was now standard. Optional were the   I6 or a  2-barrel V8 producing . Brakes were now upgraded to a safer split system including a dual reservoir master cylinder.

1968
This was the first year that Chevrolet vans had side marker lights and reflectors, as these became required by Federal Motor Vehicle Safety Standard 108. The front side markers were near the leading edge of each front door, while the rear markers were located about a foot forward of the rear on each side.

The optional V8 engine was upgraded to a  2-barrel V8 producing  at 4600 rpm and 300 lbs-ft torque at 2400 RPM).

A column shift 4-speed transmission (Borg-Warner T10) was now available as an option, as well as power brakes on the G20 3/4 ton vans.

1969
For 1969, the Chevrolet bowtie hood emblem was changed from red to blue and the 3-speed TH-350 Turbo-Hydramatic automatic transmission was an option.

"Body-integrated" air conditioning was offered on the Sportvan models. This was not a typical AC setup with dash vents and controls, but a roof-mounted unit with a single blower duct that had adjustable louvers to direct airflow. The AC unit was independent of the cabin heater. It was operated by a single knob on a roof control panel that turned on the AC and allowed the selection of fan speed. With no actual temperature control, the fan speed was the only way to adjust for the desired comfort level.

1970
The 1970 model year was the last year of the square styling, front drum brakes, and I-beam front axle. The  inline-6 engine producing  at 4200 rpm was now standard. In addition to the  2-barrel V8, a  4-barrel (255 HP at 4600 rpm, 355 lbs-ft torque at 3000 rpm) V8 engine may have been available as an option for the first time in 1970; it is referenced in the owner's manual, but not mentioned in the dealer brochures. The 3-speed automatic and manual 4-speed column shift continued as transmission options.

Air conditioning was discontinued for the 1970 model year.

Third generation (1971-1996) 

In April 1970, GM introduced the third-generation G-series vans as 1971 model-year vehicles. In a complete redesign of the model line, the vans adopted a front-engine configuration (adding a hood to the body). While using a unibody chassis, the third-generation vans derived mechanical components from the second- and third-generation C/K pickup trucks.

In production for 25 years, the third-generation G-series vans became one of the longest-produced vehicle platforms designed by General Motors.

Chassis 
In line with the two previous generations, the third-generation G-series vans again used unibody construction, integrating the frame rails into the floorpan; the side panels were constructed of a single-piece stamping. The model line was offered three wheelbase lengths: 110 inches, 125 inches, and 146 inches. From 1971 to 1989, the 146-inch wheelbase was used for cutaway chassis; for 1990, a single rear-wheel version was introduced for an extended-length van body.

The front suspension underwent an extensive design change, deleting its leaf-sprung front axle; in line with C-series pickup trucks, the vans received independent front suspension with coil springs and control arms (allowing for much wider spacing of the front wheels). The rear axle suspension largely remained the same, retaining a leaf-sprung solid rear axle.

The four-wheel drum brakes of the previous generation were abandoned, as the third-generation G-series vans adopted front disc brakes. The front disc/rear drum configuration remained unchanged throughout the entire production of the model line; heavier-duty vehicles received larger brakes. For 1993, four-wheel anti-lock braking was added as a standard feature.

Powertrain 
For its 1971 introduction, the G-series model line was offered with three different engines. A 250 cubic-inch inline-6 was offered on all versions with two V8 engines. On the -ton vehicles, a 307 cubic-inch V8 was optional, with a 350 cubic-inch V8 offered as an option on -ton and 1-ton vans. Alongside a 3-speed manual transmission, the 2-speed Powerglide was offered alongside the 3-speed Turbo-Hydromatic automatic. After 1972, the Powerglide automatic was dropped.

For 1974, the 307 was discontinued, replaced by a two-barrel 350 V8 in -ton vans.

As part of the 1978 model update, the powertrain line underwent further revision, with the 292 six dropped from G-series vans entirely; GM began the use of metric displacement figures. In line with its use in the C/K trucks, the 6.6 L V8 was dropped from the G-series for 1981.

For 1982, a 6.2 L V8 became the first diesel engine option offered in the (-ton and 1-ton) G-series. Shared with the C/K pickup trucks, an overdrive version of the Turbo-Hydramatic was introduced, adding a fourth gear.

In line with the C/K pickup trucks, a 4.3 L V6 replaced the long-running 4.1 L inline-6 as the standard engine for 1985. For 1987, the four-barrel carburetor for the V6 was replaced by throttle-body fuel injection (TBI), with the 5.0 L and 5.7 L V8s following suit. Alongside three-speed and four-speed manual transmissions, the G-series vans were offered with three-speed and four-speed automatic transmissions.

For 1988, a fuel-injected 7.4 L V8 was introduced as an option, becoming the first big-block V8 offered for the model line. For 1990, manual transmissions were discontinued and the four-speed automatic became standard equipment on nearly all body configurations; for 1992, the 4L60E and 4L80E four-speed automatics replaced the three-speed automatics entirely.

While the gasoline engine offerings would remain largely unchanged after the 1988 model year, the 6.2 L diesel was enlarged to 6.5 L for 1994, with only a naturally-aspirated version offered for the G-series vans.

For 1996, offered only as a 1-ton G30 payload series, the "G-Classic" van continued the use of non-Vortec engines.  The 5.7L V8 was now standard (dropping the 5.0L altogether), with the 4.3L V6 as an option only on standard-wheelbase vans.  The 7.4L V8 and 6.5L diesel V8 remained options.

Body 
In line with the C/K pickup trucks, the G-series vans were sold in -ton, -ton, and 1-ton series by both Chevrolet and GMC, with both divisions marketing passenger and cargo vans. As part of the shift to a front-engine design layout, the body received a conventional hood, allowing for access to the engine from outside of the vehicle.

Prior to 1995, the G-series cargo van was sold with only a driver's seat (with an optional passenger-side seat). Through its production, passenger vans were sold in multiple seating configurations (dependent on wheelbase), ranging from 5 to 15 passengers. Alongside a windowless rear body, the cargo van was offered in several window configurations.

1971-1977 

Similar in appearance to the European Bedford CF (introduced by GM subsidiary Vauxhall in 1969), the G-series vans differed from one another in divisional badging. Alongside fender badging, Chevrolet badging was centered within the grille while GMC lettering was placed on the hood above the grille. In contrast to the "Action-Line" pickup trucks, the vans are fitted with a horizontal-slat grille. Sharing mechanical commonality with the "Action-Line" pickup trucks, the steering column was sourced from the 1969 update of the C/K series; a large engine cover required a separate design for the dashboard.

For 1973, a minor revision changed the color of the Chevrolet "bowtie" emblem from blue to gold.

For 1974, the steering column and dashboard were updated (to more closely match the introduction of the "Rounded-Line" C/K pickup trucks).

For 1976, the rear bench seats were redesigned in passenger vans, allowing them to be removed without tools.

For 1977, a horizontal body line was introduced past the front doors, while fender and rear door badging were updated to match the design of the C/K pickup trucks.

Offered on a longer wheelbase, a cutaway-chassis conversion of the G-series was marketed through Chevrolet and GMC as a cargo truck, as the Hi-Cube Van and MagnaVan, respectively.

1978-1982 

For 1978, the exterior underwent a revision; along with minor changes to the fenders and the introduction of larger bumpers, the grille was redesigned. More closely matching the "Rounded-Line" C/K pickup trucks in its design, the front fascia was restyled to integrate the headlamps and turn signals into one housing; lower-trim vehicles were offered with round headlamps with square headlamps fitted to higher-trim models. The dashboard was redesigned with recessed gauge pods and an angled center console, a design that would remain in use through 1996.

For 1980, the grille saw a minor revision, adopting larger side-view mirrors for the doors. A locking steering column (with column-mounted ignition switch) was introduced for 1982, with the model line relocating the dimmer switch and wiper controls on the turn signal control stalk. As a one-year-only option, GM offered window glass on the left-side rear door (in place of both rear doors or neither).

1983-1991 

For 1983, the G-series van underwent a set of minor exterior and interior revisions. Alongside the C/K pickup trucks, the grille was redesigned, with Chevrolet receiving a horizontally-split grille and GMC receiving a 6-segment grille; rectangular headlamps were standard on all vehicles. The vans received updated fender badging, with each division receiving its own design (distinct from the C/K series).

While retaining the dashboard from 1978, a new tilt steering column was introduced (sourcing the steering wheel from Chevrolet mid-size sedans), moving the manual transmission shifter from the steering column to the floor.

For 1984, the model line introduced a second side-door configuration, with swing-out side doors (in a /-split) joining the sliding side door as a no-cost option. For 1985, the exterior underwent an update with larger taillamps and side marker lenses while the horizontal body line was added to the front doors; the grille design was derived from the C/K pickup trucks.

For 1990, GM introduced an extended-wheelbase version of the G-series van (on 1-ton series vans). Sharing its 146-inch wheelbase with the HiCube Van/MagnaVan, the extended-wheelbase van was the first version of the model line offered with a fourth rear bench seat (5 total rows of seating including first row driver and front passenger bucket seats), expanding capacity to 15 passengers (previously, the maximum seating capacity was 12 on 4 total rows of seating). While trailing Ford and Dodge by over a decade, the design was the first produced on an extended-wheelbase design. In a minor interior revision, the vans adopted the four-spoke steering wheel from the R/V trucks.

1992-1996 

After seven years largely unchanged, the G-series underwent a minor exterior update for the 1992 model year, bringing the vans in line with the R/V pickup trucks (the final Rounded-Line trucks). In line with previous versions, two headlights remained standard (on cargo vans and lower-trim passenger vans) with four headlights as an option (on higher-trim passenger vans).

Several safety features were phased in during the production of the final model update. For 1993, a brake-shift interlock (requiring the brake pedal to be depressed to shift from park) was introduced. For 1994, a driver's side airbag was added to all vehicles (under 8,500 lbs GVWR), the new steering wheel coincided with the introduction of an updated instrument panel. In another change, the -ton passenger van was withdrawn (largely overlapping the Chevrolet Astro/GMC Safari van in size).

For 1993, to bridge the gap between the G-series and the P-series stripped chassis, a heavier-duty version of the G30 cutaway chassis was introduced. Known as the G30 HD/G3500 HD, and distinguished by its forward-tilting nose, the variant was effectively a hybrid of the two model lines, mating the P30 chassis with the G30/3500 bodywork; the model line was developed primarily for recreational vehicle (RV) and bus production.

For the 1996 model year, the third-generation G-series van was renamed the "G-Classic" and was pared down to versions with a GVWR above 8,500 pounds; sales were ended in the state of California. Produced concurrently alongside its GMT600 successor, the final G-series van was produced in June 1996.

Trim 
As with previous generations, the model line was again named the G-series van (distinct from the intermediate GM G platform). Along with the previous -ton and -ton nominal payload series, a 1-ton series was offered for the first time.

Chevrolet 

Offered in 10, 20, and 30 series, the Chevrolet Chevy Van cargo van and Chevrolet Sportvan passenger van were joined by multiple nameplates through the production of the third generation. Revived from the Tri-Five station wagon series, the 1971-1996 Beauville was the highest-trim Chevrolet passenger van, offering upgraded seats and interior trim. From 1977 to 1981, the Nomad was produced as a hybrid cargo/passenger van; a five-passenger vehicle, the Nomad combined the interior trim of the Beauville with a large paneled cargo area. The Caravan (produced from 1977 to 1980) was a trim package intended for customization, consisting of a partially finished interior with plywood paneled walls, a rear roof vent and a rubber floor mat. The Bonaventure was produced during the 1980s as an intermediate trim level between the Sportvan and the Beauville.

As conversion vans were outfitted by second parties, such vehicles were badged with the Chevy Van (and GMC Vandura) cargo van nameplates.

GMC 

Offered in 1500, 2500, and 3500 series, the GMC Vandura cargo van (stylized as VANdura from 1977 to 1982) and GMC Rally passenger van were the GMC counterparts of the Chevrolet Chevy Van and Sport Van; the GMC Gaucho was a five-passenger counterpart of the Chevrolet Nomad van, while the Gypsy was the GMC counterpart of the Caravan. In line with the GMC Sierra pickup truck, the Rally passenger van was produced across multiple trim levels, with the Rally Custom and Rally STX matching the Bonaventure and Beauville, respectively.

Derived from the cargo van, cutaway van chassis were badged as Vanduras (and Chevy Vans); all examples were 1-ton vehicles (G3500/G30).

Concept vehicles
In 1966, General Motors developed the concept vehicle Electrovan, based on the GMC Handi-Van. The vehicle used a Union Carbide cryogenic fuel cell to power a 115-horsepower electric motor. It never went into production due to cost issues and safety concerns.

In popular culture 

Product placement included a customized 1983 GMC Vandura in the 1980s television series The A-Team that was driven by B. A. Baracus (portrayed by Mr. T).

"Chevy Van" is a 1975 song by Sammy Johns about a Chevrolet van.

References

 Hall, Douglas Kent (1977). Van People: The Great American Rainbow Boogie. New York: T.Y. Crowell.
 Mellon, Thomas A. Chevrolet, GMC 1/2, 3/4, 1 Ton Van Repair & Service Manual 1967–1986. Chilton's Manual.

External links

 The first fuel cell vehicle was built from a Chevrolet Van in 1966
 1977 GMC Trucks Brochure (Old Car Brochures)

1970s cars
1980s cars
1990s cars
All-wheel-drive vehicles
Cab over vehicles
Cars introduced in 1964
Van
Motor vehicles manufactured in the United States
Rear-wheel-drive vehicles
School bus chassis
Vans